Waseqa Ayesha Khan is an Awami League politician and the incumbent Member of Parliament of Reserved women's seat-31.

Early life
Khan was born on 24 July 1971. She did her bachelors and Masters in Commerce from the University of Chittagong. Her father was Ataur Rahman Khan Kaiser.

Career
Khan was elected to parliament from Reserved women's seat-31 (Chittagong) as an Awami League candidate 30 December 2018.  She has said that the construction of powerplants in Bangladesh do not take into account social and environmental standards.

In December 2019, Khan was made Finance and Planning Affairs secretary of Awami League. She is an advisor of Bistaar: Chittagong Arts Complex. She is the Vice-Chairperson of Climate Parliament Bangladesh which called for a future without the use of fossil fuel. She is the Vice President of Mohila Awami League, the women's wing of Awami League.

Khan was made the Chairman of Standing Committee on Power, Energy and Mineral Resources Ministry in June 2021.

References

Awami League politicians
Living people
11th Jatiya Sangsad members
Women members of the Jatiya Sangsad
1971 births
21st-century Bangladeshi women politicians